The 1961 Meath Intermediate Football Championship is the 35th edition of the Meath GAA's premier club Gaelic football tournament for intermediate graded teams in County Meath, Ireland. The tournament consists of 9 teams. The championship format consists of a league stage.

No team was regraded from the 1960 S.F.C.

At the end of the season Ballinabrackey, Clonard and Navan O'Mahonys 'B' applied to be regraded to the 1962 J.F.C.

On 20 August 1961, Drumree claimed their 1st Intermediate championship title when they defeated Slane 2–7 to 1–3 in the final at Pairc Tailteann.

Team changes

The following teams have changed division since the 1960 championship season.

From I.F.C.
Promoted to 1961 S.F.C.
 Athboy -  (Intermediate Champions)

Relegated to 1961 J.A.F.C.
 Carlanstown
 Castletown
 Millbrook

Relegated to 1961 J.B.F.C.
 Fordstown
 Kilberry

To I.F.C.
Regraded from 1960 S.F.C.
 None

Promoted from 1960 J.A.F.C. & J.B.F.C.
 Kilbride - (Junior & Junior 'A' Divisional Champions)
 Clonard - (Junior 'A' Divisional Runners-Up)
 Navan O'Mahonys 'B' - (Junior 'A' Semi-Finalists)

Group stage
There are 2 groups called Group A and B. The top finisher in each group will qualify for the Final. Some results were unavailable in the Meath Chronicle.

Group A

Round 1:
 Kilbride -vs- Ballinabrackey, Trim, 12/3/1961,
 Drumree -vs- Clonard, Trim, 16/4/1961,

Round 2:
 Drumree 3-1, 1-4 Kilbride, Trim, 30/4/1961,
 Clonard -vs- Ballinabrackey, Enfield, 30/4/1961,

Round 3:
 Drumree -vs- Ballinabrackey, Trim, 28/5/1961,
 Kilbride -vs- Clonard,

Group B

Round 1:
 St. Patrick's 1–3, 0-6 Dunshaughlin, Skryne, 12/3/1961,
 Slane 2-8, 0-7 Kilmainhamwood, Pairc Tailteann, 12/3/1961,
 Navan O'Mahonys 'B' - Bye,

Round 2:
 Slane 2-3, 0-7 St. Patrick's, Duleek, 30/4/1961,
 Dunshaughlin 1-11, 0-4 Navan O'Mahonys 'B', Skryne, 30/4/1961,
 Kilmainhamwood - Bye,

Round 3:
 Kilmainhamwood 0-9, 0-4 St. Patrick's, Slane, 14/5/1961,
 Slane 1-4, 0-4 Navan O'Mahonys 'B', Skryne, 28/5/1961,
 Dunshaughlin - Bye,

Round 4:
 St. Patrick's 6-10, 2-2 Navan O'Mahonys 'B', Skryne, 18/6/1961,
 Dunshaughlin 1–7, 2-4 Kilmainhamwood, Pairc Tailteann, 18/6/1961,
 Slane - Bye,

Round 5:
 Dunshaughlin 2-10, 1-4 Slane, Pairc Tailteann, 25/6/1961,
 Kilmainhamwood w/o, scr Navan O'Mahonys 'B', 
 St. Patrick's - Bye,

Final Play-off:
 Slane 3-8, 1-6 Dunshaughlin, Pairc Tailteann, 30/7/1961,

Final
 Drumree 2-7, 1-3 Slane, Pairc Tailteann, 20/8/1961,

References

External links

Meath Intermediate Football Championship
Meath Intermediate Football Championship